Chhaganlal Karamshi Parekh popularly known as Chhagan Bapa (27 June 1894 – 14 December 1968) was an Indian  philanthropist and social worker who worked for education, the end of poverty, and social reform of women.

Birth
He was born in 1894 at Rajkot in Gujarat in a Gujarati Vaishnava family of Lohana caste.

Career

At Jharia
In year 1912 at age of 18, he came to Jharia with help of Damodar Kunwarji Trivedi. He started his career as a clerk at R. A. Mucadam & Sons' Chanda colliery in Jharia owned by Parsi gentleman, Rustomji Ardesar Mukadam in same year. After a year he switched to Khas Kusunda colliery owned by Mistri Pancha Devji At salary of Rs.30/- per month, which was later raised to Rs.40/- per month. This colliery was managed by Mistri Kanji Khengar, who trained him well into job.  Later in 1914 he joined Lower & Upper Jharia Collieries located at Tisra, which were owned by Mistri owners Gangji Dossa Jethwa & Khimji Dossa Jethwa of Nagalpar. The owners were very much impressed with his work and promoted him. From here he progressed to start his own coal supply firm.

He was among the committee members of historic All India Trade Union Congress meeting hosted at Jharia in year 1928 and shared dais with other notable colliery owners like, Ramjush Agarwalla, the host and others like, D. D. Thacker, Karamshi Khora and other dignitaries.

At Calcutta
But in the year 1949, there was change in his life. He took retirement from his work and dedicated his life towards social service. He got inspiration for social work from Thakkar Bapa and became a member of Servants of India Society and served in earthquake relief works in Assam and earthquake relief works in Kutch and tribal upliftment in Himachal Pradesh

After, leaving Jharia in 1949, he spent almost a decade in Calcutta where he already had a house and offices for coal supply business. Here, he helped founding Laxminarayan Temple & Dharamshala and Laxminarayan Trust Hospital at Bhowanipore, both the establishments were funded by Gujarati diaspora of Calcutta, which included a handsome donation by him. He also helped starting couple of schools in Calcutta.

At Bombay
However, he later dedicated his whole life in social works and later shifted to Bombay.

During the earthquake of 1956 in Kutch, he worked relentlessly for the relief work, collecting funds and doing other humanitarian services. In course of his works he was also responsible for laying foundation of Anjar General Hospital and the first only girls school of Anjar known as K.K.M.S. Girls High School for which he was able to generate a munificent donation from Khatau family and Smt. Maniben Khatau Sethia of Calcutta.

At Bombay, he was inspiration behind starting of Lijjat Papad in 1959, which is a noted women's cooperative based at Mumbai. He was also one of the founding member of Gujarati Dharamshala at Haridwar. Manaji Jeram Rathod of Madhapar was a close friend and associate since Jharia days and one of the founders of Gujarati Dharamshala, who worked with Chhagan bhai in raising funds for the project

Death
He died on 14 December 1968, at Bombay, survived by his 2 sons -Ratilal and Mulchand, and their families.

Honors and memorials
The Government of India issued a postage stamp in his honor in 1999. Shri Laxminarayan Temple at Kolkata, have named the Hall in name of Chhagan Bapa as a memorial to him. From 1980,  Lijjat started giving Chhaganbapa Smruti Scholarships to the daughters of the member-sisters in his memory.

References

1894 births
1968 deaths
People from Rajkot
Gujarati people
Social workers
Indian women's rights activists
Founders of Indian schools and colleges
Indian businesspeople in coal
Businesspeople from Gujarat
Social workers from Gujarat
20th-century Indian businesspeople
20th-century Indian philanthropists